Water polo was contested by men's teams at the 2006 Asian Games in Doha, Qatar from December 6 to December 14, 2006. Ten teams competed in two round robin groups. All games were staged at the Al-Sadd Aquatic Centre.

Schedule

Medalists

Draw
The draw ceremony for the team sports was held on 7 September 2006 at Doha.

Group A

Group B

Squads

Results
All times are Arabia Standard Time (UTC+03:00)

Preliminaries

Group A

Group B

Final 9th–10th

Classification 5th–8th

Semifinals

Final 7th–8th

Final 5th–6th

Final round

Semifinals

Bronze medal match

Gold medal match

Final standing

References

 All Asian Games Results

External links
Water Polo Competition Schedule

 
2006 Asian Games events
Asian Games
2006